Dabthla is a village situated in Machhra Mandal/ block of Meerut District in Uttar Pradesh, India.

References 

Villages in Meerut district